This article shows the qualification phase for the 2018 CEV Champions League. 20 teams will enter qualification round. 12 teams have directly qualified to the League round based on the 2018 European Cups’ Ranking List.

Qualification Summary

Participating Teams

 Mladost Brcko
 Abiant Lycurgus
 Lokomotiv Novosibirsk
 Jedinstvo Bemax Bijelo Polje
 Posojilnica AICH/DOB
 Ford Store Levoranta Sastamala
 Maccabi Tel Aviv
 Sir Sicoma Colussi Perugia
 Vojvodina Novi Sad
 Luboteni Ferizaj
 Omonoia Nicosia
 Jihostroj České Budějovice
 Neftohimic 2010 Burgas
 VfB Friedrichshafen
 ACH Volley Ljubjana
 Spacer's Toulouse
 Noliko Maaseik
 Jastrzębski Węgiel
 Fenerbahçe Istanbul
 Shakhtior Soligorsk

First round
No first round matches

Second round
Home-Away matches.8 teams will play in the Second roundWinners will advance to the Third round; losers will compete in 32nd Finals of 2018 CEV Cup
All times are local

|}

First leg

|}

Second leg

|}

Third round
Home-Away matches.
12 teams have received byes into the Third round.
Winners will qualify to the League round; losers will compete in the 16th Finals of 2018 CEV Cup
All times are local

|}

First leg

|}

Second leg

League round
Drawing of Pool will be held on November 16, 2017

References

Qualification
2017 in men's volleyball